Villa chromolepida is a species of bee fly in the family Bombyliidae.

Distribution
United States.

References

Bombyliidae
Diptera of North America
Insects described in 1923